Dare to Dream is a  2005 sports documentary about the United States women's national soccer team. It describes the pivotal roles of Brandi Chastain, Mia Hamm, Julie Foudy, Kristine Lilly, and Joy Fawcett in the development of the team. These athletes also give interviews for the film. It was created by the "Peabody Award-winning creative team at HBO Sports" and " follows the 18-year journey of the U.S. women's soccer team from obscurity in the late 1980s to its second Olympic gold match in 2004." The DVD of the film was released on 19 September 2007.

Awards
2006 Billie Award in Entertainment

Notes

External links
Official Site
 
Cover girl runs with the ball - San Francisco Chronicle
Fab Five Step Off the Field and Onto the TV Screen - The New York Times
 On the Cover - The New York Times
HBO documentary features Hamm, U.S. women's soccer team

2005 television films
2005 films
HBO Sports
History of the United States women's national soccer team
Soccer on United States television
HBO documentary films
Documentary films about women's association football
2000s American films